2015 Thai League Division 1 (known as Yamaha League-1 for sponsorship reasons) was the 18th season of the League since its establishment in 1997. It is the feeder league for the Thai Premier League. A total of 20 teams competed in the league this season.

Changes from last season

Team changes

From Division 1
Promoted to Thai Premier League
 Nakhon Ratchasima Mazda
 Saraburi 
 Navy

Relegated to Regional League Division 2
 Roi Et United
 Phitsanulok
 Khonkaen
 Sriracha Ban Bueng

To Division 1
Relegated from Thai Premier League
 Police United
 PTT Rayong
 Songkhla United
 Air Force Central
 GSE Samut Songkhram

Promoted from Regional League Division 2
 Prachuap
 Thai Honda
 Sukhothai
 Phichit

Teams

Stadium and locations

Personnel and sponsoring
Note: Flags indicate national team as has been defined under FIFA eligibility rules. Players may hold more than one non-FIFA nationality.

Foreign players
The number of foreign players is restricted to five per TPL team, including a slot for a player from AFC countries. A team can use four foreign players on the field in each game, including at least one player from the AFC country.

League table

Results

Season statistics

Top scorers
As of 12 December 2015.

Hat-tricks

Attendances

See also
 2015 Thai Premier League
 2015 Regional League Division 2
 2015 Thai FA Cup
 2015 Thai League Cup
 2015 Kor Royal Cup
 Thai Premier League All-Star Football

References

Thai League 2 seasons
2015 in Thai football leagues